Sultan Khan may refer to:

Sultan Khan (chess player), Indian chess player
Sultan Khan (musician) (1940–2011), Indian sarangi player
Sultan Mohammed Khan (1919–2010), Pakistani civil servant and British India Army officer
Sultan Mohammad Khan (politician) (born 1980), Pakistani politician in Khyber Pakhtunkhwa
Sultan Muzaffar Khan, sultan of Kashmir
Sultan Said Khan, medieval ruler of East Turkestan
Sultan Satuq Bughra Khan, Uyghur ruler

See also
Amet-khan Sultan, Crimean Tatar test pilot
Kareem Rashad Sultan Khan, American soldier